Sabine Lisicki was the defending champion, but she withdrew before the tournament began due to a knee injury.

Jelena Janković won the title, defeating Angelique Kerber in the final, 3–6, 7–6(7–4), 6–1.

Seeds

Draw

Finals

Top half

Bottom half

Qualifying

Seeds

Qualifiers

Lucky losers

Draw

First qualifier

Second qualifier

Third qualifier

Fourth qualifier

Fifth qualifier

Sixth qualifier

References
Main Draw
Qualifying Draw

External links

Hong Kong Tennis Open
Hong Kong Open (tennis)
2015 in Hong Kong sport